The Anserinae are a subfamily in the waterfowl family Anatidae. It includes the swans and true geese. Under alternative systematical concepts (see e.g., Terres & NAS, 1991), it is split into two subfamilies, the Anserinae contain the geese and the ducks, while the Cygninae contain the swans.

Systematics
Swans (Tribe Cygnini) 
Genus Cygnus – true swans: The black-and-yellow-billed swans are sometimes separated in the genus Olor.
Genus †Afrocygnus (Miocene of North Africa)
Genus †Annakacygna – short-winged swans (Miocene of Japan)
Genus †Megalodytes (Miocene of Japan and California)

True geese (Tribe Anserini) 
Genus Anser – grey and white geese
Genus Branta – black geese

Unresolved
Genus Coscoroba – coscoroba swan

These two genera are distinct from other geese and often elevated to a subfamily of their own (Cereopsinae), or alternatively into the shelduck subfamily Tadorninae:

Tribe Cereopseini

Genus Cereopsis – Cape Barren goose
Genus †Cnemiornis – New Zealand geese (prehistoric)

Some enigmatic subfossils of very large goose-like birds from the Hawaiian Islands do not appear to be moa-nalos (goose-sized dabbling ducks). They cannot be assigned to any genus living today, though most, if not all, may be fairly close to Branta:
 Geochen rhuax – initially allied with Cereopsis, but this seems hardly correct for reasons of biogeography.
 Giant Hawaiʻi goose, ?Branta sp.
 Giant Oʻahu goose, Anatidae sp. et gen. indet.

References

 Terres, John K. & National Audubon Society (1991): The Audubon Society Encyclopedia of North American Birds. Wings Books, New York.

Further reading

External links

 
Bird subfamilies
Extant Miocene first appearances
Taxa named by Nicholas Aylward Vigors